Ephrath or Ephrathah or Ephratah is a biblically referenced former name of Bethlehem, meaning "fruitful". It is also a personal name.

Biblical place
A very old tradition is that Ephrath refers to Bethlehem, as the first mention of Ephrath occurs in Genesis, in reference to the place where Rachel died giving birth to Benjamin and where she was buried on the road from Bethel. Evidence that she died on the way there is reflected by the ancient Tomb of Rachel at the city's entrance.

Throughout much of the Bible, Ephrath is a description for members of the Israelite tribe of Judah, as well as for possible founders of Bethlehem.

Ephrath/Bethlehem are also connected to Messianic prophecy, as found in the book of the minor prophet Micah "But thou, Bethlehem Ephratah, though thou be little among the thousands of Judah, yet out of thee shall he come forth unto me that is to be ruler in Israel."

Personal name
Caleb's second wife was called Ephrath (or Ephrathah).

Locations named after Ephrath
Some modern places named after Ephrath include:
The Israeli settlement of Efrat, near Bethlehem
The town of Ephrata, Pennsylvania
The Ephrata Cloister, Pennsylvania, United States.
The town of Ephratah, New York
The town of Ephrata, Washington, United States.
The locality and creek of Eprapah, Victoria Point, near Brisbane, Queensland, Australia
 Nearby Coochiemudlo Island also has an Eprapah Street.
 Eprapah, the Scout environmental education training centre, located at Victoria Point, near Brisbane, Queensland, Australia

References

Torah places
Bethlehem
Former populated places in Southwest Asia
Women in the Hebrew Bible

he:אפרת